Michael Lamar Porter Jr. (born June 29, 1998) is an American professional basketball player for the Denver Nuggets of the National Basketball Association (NBA). He played college basketball for the Missouri Tigers. Porter was ranked as one of the top prospects in the class of 2017. He was selected 14th overall by the Nuggets in the 2018 NBA draft.

High school career
Porter attended Father Tolton Regional Catholic High School in Columbia, Missouri, before transferring to Nathan Hale High School in Seattle, Washington, for his senior year. His father, Michael Porter Sr., was hired by the University of Washington to be an assistant coach; former NBA player Brandon Roy was the coach of Nathan Hale's basketball team.

In Porter's junior season at Father Tolton, he led the team to the 2A State Championship. In the 2016 summer, Porter joined Mokan Elite on the Nike Elite Youth Basketball League (EYBL) averaging 26.2 points and 11.5 rebounds per game leading them to the Nike EYBL Peach Jam championship and was named Co-MVP alongside teammate and future NBA player Trae Young.

In his senior season, Porter averaged 36.2 points and 13.6 rebounds as he helped his high school team earn a perfect 29–0 record and win the Washington Class 3A State Championship. He recorded 52 points and 23 rebounds in a blowout victory over Seattle Prep on senior night. Porter was rated as a five-star recruit and ranked as one of the top overall recruits in his class by Rivals.com and ESPN.

On March 29, 2017, Porter was named MVP at the McDonald's All-American Game leading the West in a 109–107 win over the East team. Porter also participated in the 2017 Nike Hoop Summit, leading Team USA to a 98–87 victory over the World Select Team with 19 points in 23 minutes of play.

College career
In July 2016, Porter originally committed to Washington. After Lorenzo Romar was fired as Washington's head coach, Porter Sr. was hired as an assistant coach for the University of Missouri. Porter Jr. later decommitted from Washington.

On March 24, 2017, Porter committed to play for Missouri, joining his father and his younger brother, Jontay Porter (who reclassified from the class of 2018).

Porter was injured in the first half of the season opener against Iowa State. Porter was expected to miss the remainder of the 2017–18 season because of a lower back injury which required surgery. On November 22, 2017, Porter had a successful microdiscectomy of his L3-L4 spinal discs. On February 22, 2018, Porter Jr. was cleared to practice with Missouri again, with the potential to return to play before the end of the season. NBA executives were encouraging him to play if he was feeling healthy enough to do so.

Porter would officially return to action on March 8, 2018 in the quarterfinals of the SEC tournament. Porter would also play in the first round of the 2018 NCAA Division I men's basketball tournament, where the team lost to Florida State. In both games, however, Porter came off of the bench to play instead of starting as he had on opening night, mainly as a precaution. On March 27, Porter announced his intention to forgo his final three seasons of collegiate eligibility and declared for the 2018 NBA draft.

Professional career

Denver Nuggets (2018–present)
On June 21, 2018, Porter was selected with the 14th overall pick by the Denver Nuggets. He fell from a possible first overall pick to the 14th pick with the Nuggets due to reports regarding his health. The Nuggets also discussed the possibility of having him sit out for his entire first season in the NBA in relation to his back problems. On July 3, 2018, Porter signed a multi-year contract with the Nuggets. On July 19, 2018, the Nuggets announced that Porter had undergone a second back surgery.

On October 31, 2019, Porter made his debut in NBA, coming off the bench with fifteen points, four rebounds and an assist in a 107–122 loss to the New Orleans Pelicans. On December 29, Porter made his first career start in the NBA, finishing with 19 points, along with six rebounds and an assist in 26 minutes in a 120–115 win over the Sacramento Kings. He set a new career high with 25 points in 23 minutes just four days later in a win against the Indiana Pacers. On August 4, 2020, returning from the suspension of the season due to the COVID-19 pandemic, Porter Jr. led the Nuggets to their first victory in the Orlando bubble, scoring a then career-high 37 points in route to a 121–113 overtime win over Oklahoma City Thunder.

On April 24, 2021, Porter scored a career-high 39 points in a 129–116 win over the Houston Rockets.

On September 27, 2021, Porter and the Denver Nuggets agreed to a 5-year, $172 million rookie extension that will become $207 million if Porter is selected to an All-NBA Team. On November 29, 2021, having appeared in only 9 games, Porter's agent Mark Bartelstein announced Porter would miss the remainder of the 2021–22 NBA season as he would be undergoing a third back surgery.

Career statistics

NBA

Regular season

|-
| style="text-align:left;"|
| style="text-align:left;"|Denver
| 55 || 8 || 16.4 || .509 || .422 || .833 || 4.7 || .8 || .5 || .5 || 9.3
|-
| style="text-align:left;"|
| style="text-align:left;"|Denver
| 61 || 54 || 31.3 || .542 || .445 || .791 || 7.3 || 1.1 || .7 || .9 || 19.0
|-
| style="text-align:left;"|
| style="text-align:left;"|Denver
| 9 || 9 || 29.4 || .359 || .208 || .556 || 6.6|| 1.9|| 1.1 || .2 || 9.9
|- class="sortbottom"
| colspan=2 style="text-align:center"| Career
| 125 || 71 || 24.6 || .518 || .419 || .795 || 6.1 || 1.1 || .6 || .6 || 14.1

Playoffs

|-
| style="text-align:left;"|2020
| style="text-align:left;"|Denver
| 19 || 3 || 23.8 || .476 || .382 || .743 || 6.7 || .8 || .7 || .3 || 11.4
|-
| style="text-align:left;"|2021
| style="text-align:left;"|Denver
| 10 || 10 || 33.2 || .474 || .397 || .810 || 6.2 || 1.3 || 1.1 || .3 || 17.4
|- class="sortbottom"
| colspan=2 style="text-align:center"| Career
| 29 || 13 || 27.0 || .475 || .389 || .768 || 6.5 || 1.0 || .8 || .3 || 13.4

College

|-
| style="text-align:left;"| 2017–18
| style="text-align:left;"| Missouri
| 3 || 1 || 17.7 || .333 || .300 || .778 || 6.7 || .3 || 1.0 || .3 || 10.0

Personal life
Porter is a Christian and grew up as a vegetarian. In 2018, he changed his diet to raw vegan.

In addition to younger brother Jontay, he has two older sisters named Bri and Cierra, along with 4 younger siblings.

In 2017, Porter dated actress and model Madison Pettis.

COVID-19 comments 
In July 2020, amid the COVID-19 pandemic, Porter stated on Snapchat that he believed the disease was "being used obviously for a bigger agenda... for population control in just terms of being able to control the masses of people. I mean, because of the virus the whole world is being controlled." He added, "you're required to wear masks... and who knows what will happen when this vaccine comes out? You might have to have the vaccine in order to travel. Like, that would be crazy." These remarks led to Porter being reprimanded by Snapchat, with the post being deleted for violating the app's content guidelines. NBA commissioner Adam Silver also commented on the subject, saying "It's unfortunate that he said that. I would only say in our league, we have 450 players, guys are young. They're occasionally going to say silly things. I think most people quickly dismissed that comment." Nuggets coach Mike Malone let it be known that they would not "muzzle" their players and they would "just try to educate guys so that they understand the impact of what they may be saying."

References

External links

 Career statistics and player information from NBA.com
Missouri Tigers bio

1998 births
Living people
African-American basketball players
American men's basketball players
Basketball players from Missouri
Basketball players from Seattle
Denver Nuggets draft picks
Denver Nuggets players
McDonald's High School All-Americans
Missouri Tigers men's basketball players
Small forwards
Sportspeople from Columbia, Missouri
21st-century African-American sportspeople